is the third studio album by Håkan Hellström, released in 2005. The title would be translated as "Confessions of a Colic Child". Musically, the album is quite different from earlier Hellström records. The music is more folk oriented and the lyric topics are more mature, for example "Hurricane Gilbert" is about Hellström's long-time friend and guitarist Daniel Gilbert and "Jag har varit i alla städer" deals with success and its backside, in form of people trying to take advantage of Hellström.

Track listing 
"" I've been to every city
"" Brännö serenade
"" A midsummer night's dream
"" They will step on you again
"" Only fools rush in
""
""  Gårda mills and dirt
""  Magasingatan street
"" Lullaby for escapees

Charts

Weekly charts

Year-end charts

References

2005 albums
Håkan Hellström albums
Swedish-language albums